Latifolia may refer to any of the following plants:
Oxalis species:
Oxalis latifolia
Ulmus minor (Smooth-leafed elm) cultivars:
Ulmus minor 'Latifolia'
Ulmus glabra (Wych elm) cultivars:
Ulmus glabra 'Latifolia Aurea'
Ulmus glabra 'Latifolia Aureo-Variegata'
Ulmus glabra 'Latifolia Nigricans'
Vitisvinifera (wine grape) varieties:
Gaglioppo